Willing to Kill: The Texas Cheerleader Story is a 1992 American television film directed by David Greene. It stars Lesley Ann Warren and Tess Harper. It was nominated for a Young Artist Award in 1993.

It preceded, but was ultimately overshadowed by, the bigger-budgeted and more star-powered version of the "true story", The Positively True Adventures of the Alleged Texas Cheerleader-Murdering Mom.

Cast
Lesley Ann Warren as Wanda Holloway
Tess Harper as Verna Heath
Dennis Christopher as Randy
Olivia Burnette as Shanna Harper
Lauren Woodland as Amber Heath
Joanna Miles as Joyce

References

External links

Willing to Kill: The Texas Cheerleader Story at The Movie Scene

1992 television films
1992 films
1992 crime drama films
American crime drama films
American television films
Cheerleading films
Films directed by David Greene
Films set in 1991
Films set in Texas
Harris County, Texas
Crime films based on actual events
1990s English-language films
ABC Motion Pictures films
1990s American films